Almirante Brown may refer to a number of entities named after Irish-Argentine admiral William Brown:

Football clubs
Club Almirante Brown, Argentine football club from Isidro Casanova
 Club Atlético Almirante Brown, Argentine football club based in the town of Arrecifes in Buenos Aires Province
 Club Atlético Brown, an Argentine football club based in the City of Adrogué, capital of Almirante Brown Partido, Buenos Aires Province
 Club Social y Atlético Guillermo Brown, an Argentine football club based in the city of Puerto Madryn, Chubut Province

Places
 Almirante Brown Partido, Buenos Aires Province, Argentina
 Almirante Brown Department, Chaco Province, Argentina
 Almirante Brown Antarctic Base, Argentina station in Paradise Harbor, Gerlache Strait, Antarctica

Other
 ARA Almirante Brown, one of several ships serving in the Argentine Navy